Jorge Alberto Díaz de León Luque(born 28 March 1984 in San Luis Potosí, San Luis Potosí) is a Mexican retired football goalkeeper, who last played for Correcaminos on loan from UANL.

Club career

Querétaro FC
Jorge Díaz de León started his career in Tigres UANL but after being relegated to the bench in all the games he was loaned to Querétaro FC on 2009, even though his first years he was bench there too, he started playing in 2011 where he played all the Apertura 2011.

Return to Tigres UANL
After showing his skills at Querétaro he returned to Tigres for the 2011–2012 season.

Honors
Tigres UANL
Mexican Primera División:
 Winner (1): Apertura 2011

References

External links

Profile at BDFA

1984 births
Living people
People from San Luis Potosí
Mexican footballers
Association football goalkeepers
Liga MX players
Tigres UANL footballers
Alacranes de Durango footballers
Querétaro F.C. footballers
Correcaminos UAT footballers